The Pahari people or Pahari-speaking people is a cover term for a number of heterogeneous communities inhabiting the Pir Panjal Region in the Jammu division of the Indian administered Jammu and Kashmir and also parts of Pakistan administered Azad Kashmir.

Pahari is also an ambiguous term used to describe a variety of Northern Indo-Aryan languages, most of which are found in the lower Himalayas. They are divided into Eastern Pahari (which includes Nepali), Central Pahari, and Western Pahari, consisting of a number of different languages. The term is also used to refer to the Pahari-Pothwari language, a dialect of Punjabi.

Pahari Ethnic Group
Recently, the J&K Socially Economically Backward Classes Commission constituted by the Government of Jammu and Kashmir in 2020 in its report has recommended  to renaming  the group 'Pahari Speaking People' (who speak Pothowari dialects fall under Lahnda Western Punjabi) with the substitute nomenclature 'Pahari Ethnic Group' in terms of provisions that  grant Reservation  to them , as PSP,  under J&K Reservation Rules 2004 and  accordingly , the J&K government  has issued instructions on October 19, 2022  and replaced 'Pahari Speaking People' with 'Pahari Ethnic Group' , which tends to identify them as an ethnic group to be brought under the purview of the Schedule of Tribes under the Constitution of India.

People and Languages
The Pahari people are mainly referred to two groups:

 Speakers of several languages/dialects which are classified as Western Pahari by G.A. Grierson in the first Linguistic Survey of India. These include Bhadarwahi (including Bhalesi and Padri dialects), Sarazi, Gaddi and Dogri. They are predominantly spoken in the Jammu region in the Indian union territory of Jammu and Kashmir. The Pahari People who speak these languages are mainly drwan from Rajput clans popularly known as Rana, Parihar, Chandail, Charak, Chib etc.The Bhadarwahi, Sarazi, Bhalesi, Padri and Gaddi language mainly found in Doda district, Ramban district and Kishtwar district and Kathua district of Jammu region while speakers of Gujari speakers are found in entire J&K.
 Speakers of Lahnda (Western Punjabi) dialects including Pahari–Pothwari and Hindko. The dialects of the Pahari-Pothwari language complex cover most of the territory of Jammu and Azad Kashmir. People of Azad Kashmir despite not being ethnic Kashmiris possess a strong sense of Kashmiri national identity that overrides linguistic identification with closely related groups outside Azad Kashmir, such as the Punjabis of the Pothohar. The dialects are also spoken further east across the Line of Control into the Pir Panjal mountains in Indian Jammu and Kashmir. The population, estimated at 1 million, is found in the region between the Jhelum and Chenab rivers: most significantly in the districts of Poonch and Rajouri, to a lesser extent in neighbouring Baramulla and Kupwara, and also – as a result of the influx of refugees during the Partition of 1947 – scattered throughout the rest of Jammu and Kashmir.

Gujjar-Pahari rift over grant of  Scheduled Tribe status 
The Gujjars and other Tribal communities  who have already listed as Scheduled Tribes  in Jammu and Kashmir in 1991 are opposing  grant of ST status and other similar benefits to the Pahari Speaking People of J&K  with the argument that such a step will dilute the entire Scheduled Tribe status. They (Gujjars) are constantly countering the move to grant  Scheduled Tribe status to 'Pahari Speaking People' on the basis of (Pahari) Language. The Gujjars are of the view that such a move will adversely affect the development of tribes of the UT of J&K. The demand for grant of ST status – by Pahari-speaking people is based on the sole premises of the linguistic identity.

In order to oppose the demand of ST to  Paharis, the tribal Gujjar youth started foot March in November 2022.After 21 days struggle the Joint Action Committee was invited by the Home Minister of India in New Delhi for a dialogue. Noted Tribal Researcher Javaid Rahi led the dialogue for and on behalf of Gujjars of Jammu and Kashmir.

The Gujjars argue that majority of Pahari Speaking People belongs to upper class Muslims such as Syeds, Qazi, Per, Beg, Raja, Malik, Mirza, Khan, Mughals, Rajputs,  Kashmiris and upper caste Sikhs, Hindus and Christians including Brahmins, Rajputs, Mahajans and they do not face any social stigma or  caste inequality like Gujjars, Bakerwals, Gaddis and other tribes of Jammu and Kashmir do. They said as per 2011 census  the literacy rate among Scheduled Tribes of J&K is 50% and 59% in STs across India but in  Pahari Speaking People especially in Poonch, Rajouri districts it is 68% and if Paharis entered into ST status the existing tribes will get affected adversely. The Gujjars further arguing that the 'Pahari Speaking People'  do not belong to a Socially, Economically and Educationally  backward class like Gujjars, Bakarwals , Gaddis , Sippis and Shina who are in ST list of J&K.Tribes are opposing ST status to Pahari speaking as they are already enjoying 4% reservation under Actual Control Line habitat, 10% under RBA, 4% under Other Social Castes, 10% under Economically Weaker Section, 4% under Pahari Speaking besides 48% General Category and now  they are trying to get the share in 10% granted to Gujjars under ST.

Meanwhile  a number of organisations of displaced communities' have started a struggle and demanding ST status for them as they are also Paharis. In addition to this,  they are urging  for a share in 4% reservations in Govt Jobs/ Admissions granted to 'Pahari Speaking People' as these communities belongs to same clans of PSP and they speaks Pahari dialects fall under Lehnda Group.

Establishment of Pahari Board & grant of 4% Reservation to PSP
The  Government of Jammu and Kashmir has established an Advisory Board for the development of Pahari Speaking People in 1989 for the welfare of Pahari People. Nevertheless, core demands – like that for a Scheduled Tribe status and the associated affirmative action benefits – were not met. In 1989,  the Government of Jammu and Kashmir recommended to the Union Government of India that the Paharis of Kashmir should be granted such status, and this recommendation was reiterated in 1994 by the governor of Jammu and Kashmir and the chief ministers of the state.

In April 2020, the government of Jammu and Kashmir granted to "Pahari-speaking people" four percent reservation for direct recruitment and admission and distribution of seats in professional institutions. This has sparked disagreements between representatives of the two unrelated "Pahari" communities – those of eastern Kashmir and those of mountains of western Jammu – as to which group of the two constitutes the "genuine Paharis" with a more disadvantaged status, and therefore stronger claim to receiving the benefits of the reservation policy.

See also
 Punjabis

References

External links
Map of Western Pahari languages from Grierson's early 20th-century Linguistic Survey of India

Social groups of Azad Kashmir
Social groups of Jammu and Kashmir